Playas Ball is a 2003 sports, comedy, drama, and romance movie that was written and directed by Jennifer Harper and produced by Dale Davis. It stars Allen Payne and Elise Neal. The film was released on October 1, 2003 by CodeBlack Entertainment.

Plot

Allen Payne plays a basketball player who becomes involved in a sex scandal.

Cast
 Allen Payne as Cedric Tinsley, a ball player trying to go from rags to riches
 Elise Neal as Summer Twitty, Cedric's publicist
 Anthony 'Treach' Criss as Ricardo Perez, Summer's boyfriend
 Chelsi Smith as Jill Hamlin, Cedric's girlfriend
 Jordana Spiro as Tonya Jenkins, mother of Cedric's purported child
 Antony C. Hall as Lloyd Harrison, Cedric's best friend
 Tasha Smith as Vonda, Cedric's sister
 Tracey Cherelle Jones as Natasha, Summer's cousin
 MC Lyte as Laquinta, Natasha's best friend
 Gary "G-Thang" Johnson as Hakim, a chef at Cedric's favorite restaurant
 Jackie Long as Georgie, another chef at Cedric's favorite restaurant
 David Brown as Mookie, Cedric's second best friend
 Matthew Hatchette as Nick, Cedric's third best friend
Pamella D'Pella as Kennedy, the bartender

Cameos
 Judge Joe Brown as himself
 Malik Yoba as himself
 Paula Jai Parker as herself
 Derek Anderson as himself
 Scottie Pippen as himself
 Dale Davis as himself

Release

Home media
Playas Ball was released on February 6, 2007 on DVD.

External links

References

African-American films
2000s English-language films